The Best of Princess Superstar, also known as Come Up To My Room - The Best of Princess Superstar,  is Princess Superstar's first greatest hits album. Her sixth recording, the album spans two discs and includes her 2005 LP "My Machine" in its entirety.

Track listing

Disc One

 Perfect (Exceeder) Mason vs Princess Superstar
 Bad Babysitter featuring The High & Mighty
 Keith N' Me featuring Kool Keith
 Welcome To My World
 The Little Freakazoid That Could
 Get My Sh'off
 Love/Hate To Be A Player
 You Get Mad At Napster
 Crush
 Theme Song
 Wet!Wet!Wet!
 Fuck Me On The Dancefloor with Disco D
 Do It Like A Robot
 Perfect [Ajax Mix]

 Princess Superstar vs. DaFresh - Perfect Disco (Ajax's Spin) replaces the Ajax Mix of Perfect on the Australian version.

Disc Two

 Intro Via The Telepath
 I Like It A Lot
 Classroom
 Famous
 Dolly's Duplicants
 On Top Bubble
 Mysterious Hanger
 Bad Girls NYC
 10,000 Hits
 Quitting Smoking Songs
 Sex Drugs And Drugs
 Initially
 I'm So Out Of Control
 Coochie Coo
 World Council Entertainment Dicktatorship
 Perfect
 What Do You Want
 Push Make It Work
 What You Gonna Do
 My Machine
 Death Of The Superstar
 Artery
 Great Brain Revolution
 Happy
 The End

Japan track listing
 Perfect (Exceeder) Mason vs. Princess Superstar
 Licky (work it out) Larry Tee featuring Princess Superstar
 Bad Babysitter featuring The High & Mighty
 Artery
 You Get Mad At Napster
 Coochie Coo
 Super Fantasy
 Keith N Me (Remix) featuring Kool Keith
 Bad Girls NYC
 My Machine
 Fuck The Phone
 The Happy
 Famous
 Sex (I Like It)
 NYC C**T
 Blue Beretta
 Perfect
 Perfect (Exceeder) [Video] Mason vs. Princess Superstar

Come Up To My Room - The Best Of Princess Superstar track listing
 Do It Like A Robot
 Come Up To My Room featuring Barron Ricks
 Bad Babysitter featuring The High & Mighty
 Keith N' Me featuring Kool Keith
 Wet!Wet!Wet!
 You Get Mad At Napster
 I Like It A Lot
 Coochie Coo
 Perfect
 Famous
 My Machine
 Artery
 Perfect [Video]

References 

Princess Superstar albums
2007 greatest hits albums